Henrik Koefoed (born 25 November 1955) is a Danish actor. He has appeared in more than 60 films since 1979.

Selected filmography

References

External links 

1955 births
Living people
Danish male film actors
People from Vordingborg Municipality